Ballantine's is a brand of blended Scotch whisky produced by Pernod Ricard in Dumbarton, Scotland.

The Ballantine's flavour is dependent on fingerprint malts from Miltonduff and Glenburgie, blended with 50 single malts and four single grains. The brand has won many accolades and awards for its products.

The world's second highest selling Scotch whisky in 2021, it has historically been strong in Southern Europe.

History 
Ballantine's Scotch whisky can trace its heritage back to 1827, when farmer's son George Ballantine set up a small grocery store in Edinburgh supplying a range of whiskies to his clientele.
In 1865 George delegated the store's operation to his eldest son, Archibald, while he opened a larger establishment in Glasgow. Here he concentrated on the wine and spirit trade, catering to clients that included the Hindu Royal Family. He also began to create his own blends. These inspired additional demand, drawing second son, George junior, into the business. Trading as "George Ballantine and Son Ltd", the firm added a bonded warehouse and began to export their Scotch.  George senior retired in 1881 and died 10 years later at age 83 with George junior taking over.

Business thrived under George junior, and the family sold out profitably to the firm of Barclay and McKinlay in 1919. Building on the reputation and goodwill of the "Ballantine's" name, the new owners focused on developing it as a brand for their blended whiskies. When increasing resources were needed to compete fully in the growing world market, the internationally experienced Canadian distilling concern of Hiram Walker Gooderham & Worts acquired Ballantine's in 1937. The next year the company received the Grant of Heraldic Arms featured on their bottles, recognising George Ballantine & Son as an "incorporation noble on the Noblesse of Scotland".

The new owners' first task was to secure fillings, to which end the Miltonduff and Glenburgie Distilleries were purchased, and a massive new grain distillery – the largest in Europe – built at Dumbarton. 
During the 1960s the company turned to Europe - at that time an unexplored market for Scotch whisky – and by 1965 had secured such a strong foothold there that it resolved to gear the home trade to supporting the overseas business.

Strong distribution and the popularity of Scotch whisky  in the mid-1980s were key influencers in growth. Ballantine's was named the number one brand in Europe and the third largest in the world in 1986 with the oldest product Ballantine's Finest. In Korea, Ballantine's is the clear number one in the super-premium category with its ever-popular Ballantine's 17 in addition to 21 and 30. In 1988, the Company became part of the global beverage conglomerate Allied Domecq.

In 2002 the large Dumbarton Grain distillery was mothballed, with production shifting to the Strathclyde Grain distillery in the Gorbals of Glasgow. In 2005 Ballantine's was acquired by Pernod Ricard. Ballantines still maintain a large bonded warehouse complex in Dumbarton East and a bottling plant to the North of the town.

In 2006, Sandy Hyslop was appointed as Ballantine's Master Blender – the 5th Master Blender in Ballantine's 180-year history.

Products

Ballantine's produces a range of seven expressions with various characteristics and age statements:
Finest: blended – "soft, sweet and complex"
Limited: blended – "creamy soft and smooth"
12-year-old: blended – "fresh, soft, and nutty"
12-year-old "Pure Malt": blended malt – "honey sweet, spicy and deep"
17-year-old: blended – "creamy, harmonious and oak-sweetness"
21-year-old: blended – "spig, aromatic and heather smoke"
30-year-old: blended – "rich, oak influenced and lingering"
40-year-old: blended – "incredible depth, complex and extremely fruity"

References

External links
Ballantines Official Site
Pernod Ricard website
https://web.archive.org/web/20080218091245/http://www.leaveanimpression.de/
Leave an impression website sponsored by Ballantine's
Leave an impression website (Germany)
Leave an impression website (Portugal)

1827 establishments in Scotland
Companies based in West Dunbartonshire
British companies established in 1827
Dumbarton
Scottish brands
Pernod Ricard brands
Blended Scotch whisky
Food and drink companies established in 1827